The European Orienteering Championships were first held in 1962. They have been held biennially since 2000. From 2020, the European Orienteering Championships will be held annually, with sprint events and forest events in alternate years.

Format
The competition format has changed several times. From the beginning in 1962, the World Championships consisted of only two competitions: an individual race and an unofficial relay. The relay event was an official event for the first time in the 1964 European Championships. EOC was not arranged from 1964 to 2000. In 2000, a sprint race (roughly 12–15 minutes winning time). In 2002, a short distance race (roughly 20–25 minutes) was added. The middle distance (roughly 30–35 minutes) replaced the short distance in 2004 On IOF's 23rd congress in Lausanne in 2012, it was decided that a sprint relay event would be added in the 2016 European Orienteering Championships in Jeseník, Czech Republic. The sprint relay are competed in urban areas and consists of four-orienteer mixed-gender teams with starting order woman-man-man-woman.

Current competition format
The current championship events are:

Host towns/cities

Individual/Classic/Long

Men

Women

Middle

Men

Women

Short/Sprint

Men

Women

Relay

Men

Women

Sprint relay

See also 
 World Orienteering Championships
 Junior World Orienteering Championships

External links and references
European Orienteering Championships, senior statistics 1962-2004
EOC 2006 Statistics 
EOC 2006 Official site 
EOC 2008 Official site 
EOC 2010 Official site
EOC 2012 Official site
EOC 2014 Official site
EOC 2016 Official site
EOC 2018 Official site
EOC 2020 in IOF Eventor
Hungarian orienteers on the European Championships (9 June 2008)

References

 
Orienteering competitions
Orienteering
Recurring sporting events established in 1962